Chompoothip Jundakate (born 3 November 1995) is a Thai tennis player.

Jundakate has a career-high singles ranking by the WTA of 540, achieved on 24 June 2019. She also has a career-high WTA doubles ranking of 612, reached on 15 July 2019. She has won two doubles titles on the ITF Women's Circuit.

Jundakate represents Thailand in the Fed Cup.

ITF Circuit finals

Doubles: 5 (3 titles, 2 runner–ups)

References

External links
 
 
 

1995 births
Living people
Chompoothip Jundakate
Universiade medalists in tennis
Chompoothip Jundakate
Medalists at the 2019 Summer Universiade
Medalists at the 2017 Summer Universiade
Chompoothip Jundakate